Nigel Paterson is a Primetime Emmy Award-winning British television writer, director and producer.

Biography
Paterson began his career at the BBC as part of the production team on the 2001 series Walking with Beasts for which he shared the 2002 Primetime Emmy Award for Animated Program – More Than One Hour.

He co-wrote and co-directed the 2006 series Nuremberg: Nazis on Trial that re-enacted the Nuremberg Trials of prominent Nazi war criminals.

He directed and produced the 2007 Wolof Wrestling episode of the series Last Man Standing.

Filmography
 2001 Walking with Beasts producer & director
 2001 Triumph of the Beasts & The Beasts Within  producer
 2002 Human Instinct director
 2003 Human Senses director
 2004 Meet the Ancestors: The Hunt for Darwin's Beagle director
 2004 Bermuda Triangle: Beneath the Waves director
 2005 The Truth About Killer Dinosaurs director
 2005 Horizon/Nova: The Ghost in Your Genes  producer & director
 2006 Nuremberg: Nazis on Trial director & writer
 2007 Last Man Standing: Wolof Wrestling producer & director
 2008 In Search of Medieval Britain producer
 2008 James May's Big Ideas producer
 2011 Planet Dinosaur producer & director
 2016 The Beginning and End of the Universe producer & director

References

Year of birth missing (living people)
Living people
British television producers